Modern Physics and Ancient Faith (2003) is a book by Stephen M. Barr, a physicist from the University of Delaware  and frequent contributor to First Things. This book is "an extended attack" on what Barr calls scientific materialism.  National Review says of the book: "[A] lucid and engaging survey of modern physics and its relation to religious belief. . . . Barr has produced a stunning tour de force . . . [a] scientific and philosophical breakthrough."

Contents
The book is divided into five parts spanning 26 chapters. The main religious and philosophical themes include determinism, mind as a machine, anthropic principle, and the big bang theory.
Its main thesis is that science and religion only appear in conflict because many have "conflated science with philosophical materialism."

Reviews
 James F. Salmon. Theological Studies March 2005 v66 i1 p207(3)
 Stephen P. Weldon. Isis, Dec 2004 v95 i4 p742(2)
 Alan G. Padgett. Theology Today July 2004 v61 i2 p229(4)
 Kirk Wegter-McNelly. The Journal of Religion April 2004 v84 i2 p302(2)
 Robin Collins, First Things: A Monthly Journal of Religion and Public Life Nov 2003 i137 p54(4)
 Ray Olson, Booklist, Oct 1, 2003 v100 i3 p285(1)
 Choice: Current Reviews for Academic Libraries, Oct 2003 v41 i2 p377
 The Christian Century Sept 6, 2003 v120 i18 p39(2)
 Catholic Library World Sept 2003 v74 p37
 Human Events June 2, 2003 v59 p16
 "Signposts of the Divine", Joshua Gilder, National Review April 21, 2003 v55 i7 pNA
 Augustine J. Curley, Library Journal, March 15, 2003 v128 i5 p88(1)
 Bryce Christensen. Booklist Feb 1, 2003 v99 i11 p959(1)

See also 
 Issues in Science and Religion

References

External links
 Barr's listing on University of Delaware's website
 Barr's Webpage on University of Delaware's website

Books about religion and science
2003 non-fiction books
Philosophy of science books
Popular physics books
Books about Christianity